Spike Salman is a Dutch international rugby union player who currently plays for French Top 14 team Racing 92. He grew up in France however both his parents are Dutch and he has strong family connections to the Netherlands.

Career 
He began his career Marseille Méditerranée in France and went through the regional selection system and got chosen by the FFR to follow their school and rugby formation course. 

He played for Toulon Espoirs for three years and then got scouted by Racing 92 to play for their Espoir team and train with the first team. He is yet to make his senior debut for Racing 92.

Salman earned his first cap in the 2022 Rugby Europe Championship, in the 10-72 defeat to Georgia. He scored his first and only international try so far in the same tournement, when playing in the 12-38 defeat to Romania.

References

External links 

French rugby union players
Rugby union flankers
Racing 92 players
Living people
2001 births